The Regions Center (formerly the AmSouth Center, before that the AmSouth-Sonat Tower, and originally the First National-Southern Natural Building)  is a 390 foot (119 meter) tall, 30 story office tower located at the northwest corner of 20th Street and 5th Avenue North in Birmingham, Alabama, United States.

The building served as the corporate headquarters for AmSouth Bancorporation from 1972 until 2006, and Sonat, Inc. and its subsidiaries from 1972 until 2007 when it relocated to the Colonial Brookwood Center. The building now serves as the corporate headquarters for Regions Financial Corporation.

History
Completed in 1972, the modernist-style skyscraper was designed by Welton Becket & Associates of Houston with Charles H. McCauley Associates serving as the local associated firm. Built as a partnership between First National Bank and Southern Natural Gas Corporation, its original name was the First National-Southern Natural Building. The reflective glass skin stretches between a generously scaled black granite base story and a louvered steel penthouse enclosure. The building is set back from the corner with a raised terrace plaza. A one-story banking lobby facing 20th Street closes off the north side of a sunken courtyard which serves the basement-level cafeteria.

During the early 1980s First National changed its name to AmSouth Bancorporation as well as Southern Natural Gas changing its name to Sonat, Inc., and the building was then given its most familiar name the AmSouth-Sonat Tower. In 1986, Sonat announced that it would sell its 50 percent interest in the building to AmSouth and lease back its half of the building, but decided to retain its interest instead.

In 1999, Sonat merged with Houston based El Paso Corporation. El Paso maintained a large presence in the building with its Southern Natural Gas division using it as its headquarters. El Paso also had energy trading offices located in the building after it merged Sonat's Marketing and Power Marketing divisions to its own energy trading business. In 2001, Sonat finally sold its 50 percent interest in the building to AmSouth. As a result the building's name changed again in 2002, being renamed the AmSouth Center.

In November 2006, after the merger of AmSouth and Regions, the name of the building officially changed to the Regions Center with the new Regions logo replacing the AmSouth logo. On January 29, 2007, Southern Natural announced that it would move its headquarters to the Colonial Brookwood Center, located in one of Birmingham's suburbs. After renovating Sonat's former offices, Regions became the sole occupant of the building.

Lighting
During the Christmas season 2,200 colored gels are illuminated in each panel of the glass curtain wall, creating an enormous lit graphical display visible on the skyline from well outside the city. The east side is a Christmas tree, the south a wreath, the west a candy cane, and the north a stocking.

Since 2007, the building has been illuminated every May for the Regions Tradition and the Regions Charity Classic before that. All four sides of the building are illuminated to depict a golfer teeing off.

See also
List of tallest buildings in Birmingham, Alabama
Regions Financial Corporation
AmSouth Bancorporation
Sonat, Inc. / El Paso Corporation
Birmingham, Alabama

References

External links
 Emporis Regions Center

Regions Financial Corporation
Skyscraper office buildings in Birmingham, Alabama
Office buildings completed in 1972
Financial services company headquarters in the United States
Bank buildings in Alabama
Welton Becket buildings
1972 establishments in Alabama
Modernist architecture in Alabama